Admiral Sir Denis William Boyd,  (6 March 1891 – 21 January 1965) was a Royal Navy officer who served as Fifth Sea Lord from 1943 to 1945, and as Commander-in-Chief, Far East Fleet from 1946 to 1949.

Naval career

Early career
Boyd joined the Royal Navy as a midshipman in 1906 and was commissioned in 1910. After serving as Torpedo Officer in  during World War I, he set off on a journey around the world aboard  in 1922. He returned in 1923 and was then attached to the Royal Australian Navy from 1926. He was appointed Fleet Torpedo Officer in the Mediterranean Fleet in 1928 and, while serving with the Naval Equipment Department, he was promoted to captain in 1931. He was briefly Commanding Officer of the destroyer  in 1932, before joining the Tactical Division of the naval Staff in 1933 and becoming its Director in 1934.

He was then made commanding officer of the Torpedo School  in 1938, serving there until the outbreak of World War II.

World War II
During the Second World War, Boyd captained the aircraft carrier  from 1940, seeing action at the Battle of Taranto. Promoted to rear admiral in August 1941, he became admiral commanding aircraft carriers in the Mediterranean Fleet. He was appointed Fifth Sea Lord and Chief of Naval Air Equipment in 1943, and was promoted to vice admiral in August 1944. He then became Admiral (Air) at the RN Air Station at Lee-on-Solent in January 1945.

Post-war service
Boyd became Commander-in-Chief of the Far East Fleet in 1946. He was promoted to admiral in 1948 and retired in 1949.

Later life
In retirement, Boyd became Principal of Ashridge College. He died, aged 73, on 21 January 1965.

References

|-

1891 births
1965 deaths
Royal Navy admirals of World War II
Knights Commander of the Order of the Bath
Commanders of the Order of the British Empire
Recipients of the Distinguished Service Cross (United Kingdom)
Lords of the Admiralty
Admiralty personnel of World War II
Military personnel from Manchester